Barrett, The Honors College at Arizona State University (formerly known as ASU University Honors College) is a university honors program. The program maintains a presence at all of ASU's Arizona campuses.

References

External links
 Official website

Arizona State University
Public honors colleges
Public universities and colleges in Arizona
Educational institutions established in 1988
1988 establishments in Arizona